Spongiivirga is a Gram-negative, strictly aerobic, rod-shaped and non-motile genus of bacteria from the family of Flavobacteriaceae with one known species (Spongiivirga citrea). Spongiivirga citrea has been isolated from the marine sponge Tethya sp..

References

Flavobacteria
Bacteria genera
Monotypic bacteria genera
Taxa described in 2015